The ruby seadragon (Phyllopteryx dewysea) is a marine fish in the family Syngnathidae, which also includes seahorses. It inhabits the coast of Western Australia. The species was first described in 2015, making it only the third known species of seadragon, and the first to be discovered in 150 years.

The team that discovered this species named the marine fish after its color. They believe it is so red because it inhabits the deeper waters, where red hues are absorbed more efficiently, and thus being red colored can aid in camouflage.

In April 2016, researchers used an underwater camera to film a video of a live specimen for the first time, publishing their findings in January 2017.  The video confirmed that the ruby seadragon has stumpy lobes, rather than the longer (common) or elaborate (leafy) lobes that protrude from the other seadragons in the family Syngnathidae.

Based on records, many assumed that the ruby seadragon normally lives at depths beyond normal scuba range and diving limits, which may explain why it went undiscovered for so long. The species is found more often offshore in deeper waters.

Scientific papers have been done by the University of Western Australia and Scripps Institution of Oceanography in San Diego.

The ruby seadragon has a prehensile tail, which means it can use its tail to hold and manipulate objects. Other species of seadragon do not have this type of tail, so this could point to an evolutionary cause.  It is unknown if they developed this trait or if the other species lost it over time.

See also
Leafy seadragon

References

External links

Fishes of Australia : Phyllopteryx dewysea
 

ruby seadragon
Marine fish of Western Australia
ruby seadragon